Orthopoxvirus is a genus of viruses in the family Poxviridae and subfamily Chordopoxvirinae. Vertebrates, including mammals and humans, and arthropods serve as natural hosts. There are 12 species in this genus. Diseases associated with this genus include smallpox, cowpox, horsepox, camelpox, and monkeypox. The most widely known member of the genus is Variola virus, which causes smallpox. It was eradicated globally by 1977, through the use of Vaccinia virus as a vaccine. The most recently described species is the Alaskapox virus, first isolated in 2015.

Microbiology

Structure

Orthopoxviruses are enveloped with brick-shaped geometries and virion dimensions around 200 nm wide and 250 nm long.

Genome 
Member viruses have linear DNA genomes around 170–250 kb in length.

Lifecycle

Viral replication is cytoplasmic. Entry into the host cell is achieved by attachment of the viral proteins to host glycosaminoglycans (GAGs), which mediate cellular endocytosis of the virus. Fusion of the viral envelope with the plasma membrane releases the viral core into the host cytoplasm. Expression of early-phase genes by viral RNA polymerase begins at 30 minutes after infection. The viral core is completely uncoated as early expression ends, releasing the viral genome into the cytoplasm. At this point, intermediate genes are expressed, triggering genomic DNA replication by the viral DNA polymerase about 100 minutes post-infection. Replication follows the DNA strand displacement model. Late genes are expressed from 140 min to 48 hours postinfection, producing all viral structural proteins. Assembly of progeny virions begins in cytoplasmic viral factories, producing a spherical immature particle. This virus particle matures into the brick-shaped intracellular mature virion, which can be released upon cell lysis, or can acquire a second membrane from the Golgi apparatus and bud as extracellular enveloped virions. In this latter case, the virion is transported to the plasma membrane via microtubules.

Transmission 
Natural hosts of orthopoxviruses are mammals and arthropods. Member viruses are transmitted by respiratory droplets, contact, and zoonosis.

Distribution
Some orthopoxviruses, including the monkeypox, cowpox, and buffalopox viruses, have the ability to infect non-reservoir species. Others, such as ectromelia and camelpox viruses, are highly host-specific. Vaccinia virus, maintained in vaccine institutes and research laboratories, has a very wide host range. Vaccine-derived vaccinia has been found replicating in the wild in Brazil, where it has caused infections in rodents, cattle, and even humans. Following the eradication of variola virus, camelpox has become one of the most economically important Orthopoxvirus infections, because many subsistence-level nomadic communities depend heavily on camels.

Taxonomy

The genus contains the following species:

 Abatino macacapox virus
 Akhmeta virus
 Alaskapox virus
 Camelpox virus
 Cowpox virus
 Ectromelia virus
 Monkeypox virus
 Raccoonpox virus
 Skunkpox virus
 Taterapox virus
 Vaccinia virus
 †Variola virus
 Volepox virus

Evolution 
Among the path of evolution of the Orthopoxvirus species, many genes are truncated (but still functional), fragmented, or lost. Cowpox strains tend to have the most intact genes. Predicting the phylogeny by sequence or by gene content produces somewhat different results:

Some of the differences in the two trees are attributed to the procedure of passage in producing vaccinia strains. The Modified vaccinia Ankara strain in this regard has much gene loss related to in vitro passage, and horsepox being a vaccinia strain found in a natural outbreak has less.

Infection in humans

Zoonoses
Following the eradication of the human-specific variola virus (smallpox), all human Orthopoxvirus infections are zoonoses. Monkeypox occurs naturally only in Africa, particularly in the Democratic Republic of the Congo. However, human and prairie dog cases have occurred in the US due to contact with animals imported from Ghana, while in May of 2022 an outbreak of monkeypox began spreading globally. Cowpox only occurs in Europe and adjacent Russian states, and despite its name, occurs only rarely in cattle. One common host is the domestic cat, from which human infections are most often acquired. Cowpox virus has also infected a variety of animals in European zoos, such as elephants, resulting in human infection.

Laboratory transmission
Aerosols of concentrated virus may result in Orthopoxvirus infection, especially in unimmunized individuals. In addition, needle sticks with concentrated virus or scratches from infected animals may result in local infection of the skin even in immunized individuals. Cowpox infection in Europe is an occupational hazard for veterinary workers, and to a lesser extent, farm workers.

Signs and symptoms
The initial symptoms of Orthopoxvirus infection include fever, malaise, head and body aches, and occasionally vomiting.  With the exception of monkeypox infection, one lesion is the norm, although satellite lesions may be produced by accidental autoinoculation. Individual lesions, surrounded by inflammatory tissue,  develop and progress through macules, papules, vesicles, and pustules, and eventually become dry crusts. (Lesions alone are not diagnostic for Orthopoxvirus infection and may be mistaken for zoonotic Parapoxvirus infections, anthrax or Herpesvirus infections.) Severe edema and erythema may affect large areas of the body in cases of severe infection. Encephalitis (alteration of mental status and focal neurologic deficits), myelitis (upper- and lower-motor neuron dysfunction, sensory level, and bowel and bladder dysfunction), or both may result from Orthopoxvirus infection. Rarely, orthopoxviruses may be detected in cerebrospinal fluid.

Regarding specific Orthopoxvirus infections, human monkeypox most resembles mild smallpox.  Human cowpox is a relatively severe localized infection. A survey of 54 cases reported three cases of generalized infection, including one death.

Treatment
Vaccinia-specific immunoglobulins may be administered to infected individuals. The only product currently available for treatment of complications of Orthopoxvirus infection is vaccinia immunoglobulin (VIG), which is an isotonic sterile solution of the immunoglobulin fraction of plasma from persons vaccinated with vaccinia virus. It is effective for treatment of eczema vaccinatum and certain cases of progressive vaccinia. However, VIG is contraindicated for the treatment of vaccinial keratitis. VIG is recommended for severe generalized vaccinia if the patient is extremely ill or has a serious underlying disease. VIG provides no benefit in the treatment of postvaccinal encephalitis and has no role in the treatment of smallpox. Current supplies of VIG are limited, and its use is reserved for treatment of vaccine complications with serious clinical manifestations. The recommended dosage of the currently available VIG is 0.6 ml/kg of body weight. VIG must be administered intramuscularly and is ideally administered as early as possible after the onset of symptoms. Because therapeutic doses of VIG might be substantial (e.g., 42 ml for a person weighing 70 kg), the product may be administered in divided doses over a 24- to 36-hour period. Doses can be repeated, usually at intervals of 2–3 days, until recovery begins (i.e., no new lesions appear). The CDC is currently the only source of VIG for civilians.

Certain antiviral compounds such as tecovirimat (ST-246) have been reported to be 100% active against vaccinia virus or other orthopoxviruses in vitro and among test animals. Tecovirimat has been granted orphan drug status by the Food and Drug Administration (FDA) and is currently under study to determine its safety and effectiveness in humans. Another example is brincidofovir. In June 2021, the FDA approved this drug for the treatment of smallpox in humans, making it the first drug approved for an effectively extinct mechanism of action. The decision followed a priority review by the agency, motivated by growing concern of potential bioweapon development. Since the target virus is eradicated the efficacy could not be directly verified but was inferred via proxy, animal survival following infection by related species of Orthopoxvirus. In contrast, safety data was available from trials of the drug in treating Cytomegalovirus infections in humans.

Imatinib, a compound approved by the FDA for cancer treatment, has been shown to limit the release of extracellular enveloped virions and to protect mice from a lethal challenge with vaccinia. Currently, imatinib and related compounds are being evaluated by the CDC for their efficacy against variola virus and monkeypox virus.

Lab synthesis
In the summer of 2017, researchers at the University of Alberta recreated horsepox via lab synthesis to conduct research into using viruses to treat cancer.

References

External links
 Viralzone: Orthopoxvirus
 ICTV
 Virus Pathogen Database and Analysis Resource (ViPR): Poxviridae

Chordopoxvirinae
Virus genera

fr:Orthopoxvirus